Theo Hill (born May 22, 1982) is an American jazz pianist. He has recorded four albums as a leader.

Biography
Theo Hill was born and raised in Albany, New York, United States.  He began playing piano at age five, and graduated from the Jazz Conservatory of the State University of New York at Purchase in 2004 with a Bachelor of Arts, cum laude.

Hill’s first CD, Theo Hill Quartet: Live at Smalls (SmallsLive), was released in January 2015 and features Dayna Stephens on saxophone, Mark Whitfield, Jr. on drums, Joe Sanders on bass, and Rodney Green on drums. In The New York Times, Nate Chinen described Live at Smalls as a fine album and characterized Hill as "a painterly young pianist with a chamber-like approach to composition".

His sophomore effort Promethean (Posi-Tone Records) was released in May 2017 featuring sidemen Yashushi Nakamura on bass and Mark Whitfield, Jr. on drums.  Brian Zimmerman of DownBeat gave the album received an Editors’ Choice review lauding Hill's “formidable piano chops and probing arrangements make [the] album such a winning statement.”

Hill's latest album, Interstellar Adventures (Posi-Tone Records), was released in June 2018 and features Rudy Royston on drums and Rashaan Carter on bass.  It received a -star rating from DownBeat a four star review from All About Jazz which noted Hill's "steady, determined ascent into the contemporary ranks of vital and inspired jazz pianists", and the July 2018 issue of The New York City Jazz Record observed that "[t]here’s not a weak spot on the record", complimented Royston and Carter as a "phenomenal" rhythm section, and noted that Rashaan Carter is "a real under-the-radar master".

Hill is based in New York and frequently appears at popular jazz clubs, including Smalls Jazz Club, Mezzrow, and Fat Cat. He frequently appears with the Mingus Big Band, Frank Lacy, Bill Saxton, Josh Evans, and T.S. Monk.

Discography

As leader

As sideman

References

1982 births
Living people
American jazz pianists
American male pianists
Musicians from Albany, New York
State University of New York at Purchase alumni
Jazz musicians from New York (state)
21st-century American pianists
21st-century American male musicians
American male jazz musicians